Cédric Hengbart (born 13 July 1980) is a French professional football manager and former player. He is assistant coach at Ligue 2 club Caen. In his playing days, he was a defender.

Playing career

Ajaccio
On 31 May 2013, AC Ajaccio announced the signing of Hengbart on a two-year contract.

Kerala Blasters
On 21 August 2014, Hengbart was drafted by Indian Super League side Kerala Blasters.

Hengbart was instrumental in Kerala Blasters FC reaching the Hero ISL 2014 finals and also notched up an assist en route. Hengbart registered the second best passing accuracy (88.19%) in ISL 2014 (*Minimum 4 matches), having completed 381 passes.

NorthEast United
The following season, he signed for NorthEast United FC.

Kerala Blasters
Again in August 2016, Hengbart returned to Kerala Blasters. On 17 October 2016, he scored his first goal for Kerala Blasters, the only goal in a 1–1 draw, playing away against Pune City.

He wore the armband when marquee player Aaron Hughes went for his international duty or was injured.

Managerial career 
On 23 March 2021, Hengbart was promoted to assistant coach of Caen following the dismissal of Pascal Dupraz and appointment of Fabrice Vandeputte as head coach.

References

External links

1980 births
Living people
People from Falaise, Calvados
Sportspeople from Calvados (department)
French footballers
Footballers from Normandy
Association football defenders
Ligue 1 players
Ligue 2 players
Indian Super League players
Maltese Premier League players
Stade Malherbe Caen players
AJ Auxerre players
AC Ajaccio players
Kerala Blasters FC players
Kerala Blasters FC draft picks
Mosta F.C. players
French football managers
French expatriate footballers
French expatriate sportspeople in India
Expatriate footballers in India
French expatriate sportspeople in Malta
Expatriate footballers in Malta